Johann Christoph Friedrich Klug (5 May 1775, in Berlin – 3 February 1856, in Berlin), was a German entomologist.
He described the butterflies and some other insects of Upper Egypt and Arabia in Christian Gottfried Ehrenberg and Wilhelm Friedrich Hemprich's Symbolæ Physicæ (1829 in Berlin – 1845). He was professor of medicine and entomology  in the University of Berlin (known in the present day as the Humboldt University of Berlin) where he curated the insect collections from 1810 to 1856. At the same time he directed the Botanic Garden in Berlin which contains his collections. Klug worked mainly on Hymenoptera and Coleoptera. The plant genus Klugia (now called Rhynchoglossum, Family Gesneriaceae) was named in his honour as well as the butterflies Geitoneura klugii and Heliophisma klugii.

In 1855, he was elected a foreign member of the Royal Swedish Academy of Sciences.

Works
(Partial List)
 Die Blattwespen nach ihren Gattungen und Arten zusammengestellt. Sitzungsberichte der Gesellschaft naturforschender Freunde zu Berlin 6: 45–62, 276–310 (1814).
 Entomologische Monographieen. Berlin. p. 172–196 (1824).
Insecta. in: Ehrenberg, C.G. Symbolae Physicae, seu icones et descriptiones corporum naturalium novarum aut minus cognitorum (1829–1845) 
Berich über eine auf Madagascar veranstaltete Sammlung von Insecten aus der Ordnung Coleoptera. Abhandlungen der Preussische Akademie der Wissenschaften, pp. 91–223 (1833).
Uebersicht der Tenthredinetae der Sammlung (des Berliner entomologischen Museums). Jahrbücher der Insektenkunde 1: 233–253 (1834).
With Carl Heinrich Hopffer and illustrated by Bernhard Wienker and Neue Schmetterlinge der Insekten-Sammlung des Königl. Zoologischen Musei der Universität zu Berlin Hft. (Volume) 1 – 2 Berlin : Bei dem Herausgeber BHL (1836)
Fortsetzung der Diagnosen der neuen (und bereits seit mehreren Monaten vollständig gedruckten) Coleopteren, welche die Insectensendungen des Herrn Dr. Peters von Mossambique enthalten hatten, von der Familie der Staphylinii an bis zu den Lamelicornia, diese mit eingeschlossen.Berichten der Akademie der Wissenschaften, Berlin 20: 643–660 (1855)
Ueber die Geschlechtsverschiedenheit der Piezaten. Erster Haelfte der Fabriciusschen Gattungen. Mag. Ges. Naturf. Freunde Berlin 1: 68–80. (1807)

References
Evenhuis, N. L. 1997: Litteratura taxonomica dipterorum (1758–1930). Volume 1 (A-K)
Gerstaecker, C.E.A., 1856: [Klug, J. C. F.]  Ent. Ztg. [Stettin] 17:225
Henriksen, K. L. 1923: [Biographien] Ent. Meddel. 15(3):139

Coleopterists
Hymenopterists
German lepidopterists
1775 births
1856 deaths
Members of the Royal Swedish Academy of Sciences
Academic staff of the Humboldt University of Berlin
18th-century German scientists
19th-century German scientists